The Wollongong Warriors Quidditch Club (WWQC) is the muggle quidditch club of the University of Wollongong, in New South Wales, Australia. Wollongong Warriors are a part of the Australian Quidditch Association (AQA), the governing body of Australian Quidditch, which is a constituent part of the International Quidditch Association (IQA).

History 
In the book Quidditch Through the Ages, by J.K Rowling, the Wollongong Warriors are listed as one of Australia's premier Quidditch teams. They have a fierce rivalry with the Thundelarra Thunderers, and are the inventors of the Wollongong Shimmy, a high-speed zig-zag move designed to confuse and distract opposing Chasers.

Early days 
Wollongong Warriors is now a real-world club in the Australian Quidditch Association, a Muggle quidditch league.

See also

References

External links

Quidditch Australia page
 History
 
 
 

Quidditch teams
Sports teams in Wollongong
Sports clubs established in 2011
2011 establishments in Australia
University of Wollongong
University and college sports clubs in Australia